The women's 400 metres event at the 2006 World Junior Championships in Athletics was held in Beijing, China, at Chaoyang Sports Centre on 15, 16 and 17 August.

Medalists

Results

Final
17 August

Semifinals
16 August

Semifinal 1

Semifinal 2

Semifinal 3

Heats
15 August

Heat 1

Heat 2

Heat 3

Heat 4

Heat 5

Participation
According to an unofficial count, 38 athletes from 30 countries participated in the event.

References

400 metres
400 metres at the World Athletics U20 Championships